Gazeta em Que Se Relatam as Novas Que Houve Nesta Corte e Que vieram de Várias Partes was the first newspaper to be published in Lisbon, Portugal and also the first newspaper to be published in the Portuguese language. It was first published in 1641, by Manuel de Galhegos . Scholars refer to this paper also as Gazeta da Restauração (Gazette of the Portuguese Restoration). There are known 36 issues of the newspaper.

References

1641 establishments in Portugal
Publications established in 1641

Portuguese-language newspapers